Simen Nordermoen (born 26 June 1995) is a Norwegian football defender who currently is a free agent.

He started his career in Fjellhamar FK, where he made his 3. divisjon debut already in 2010. Ahead of the 2012 season he signed for Lillestrøm's B team. He made his senior debut in the Norwegian Premier League in a 1-7 loss to Aalesund in May 2013.

Career statistics

References

1995 births
Living people
People from Lørenskog
Norwegian footballers
Lillestrøm SK players
Eliteserien players
Association football defenders
Sportspeople from Viken (county)